Sergei Borisovich Tsukanov (born 14 January 1986) is a Russian former professional football player.

Club career
He made his Russian Football National League debut for FC Sportakademklub Moscow on 30 March 2008 in a game against FC Zvezda Irkutsk.

External links
 

1986 births
People from Novousmansky District
Living people
Russian footballers
Russia under-21 international footballers
Association football defenders
FC Krasnodar players
FC Salyut Belgorod players
FC Sokol Saratov players
FC Baltika Kaliningrad players
FC Yenisey Krasnoyarsk players
FC Luch Vladivostok players
FC Fakel Voronezh players
FC Dynamo Bryansk players
FC Torpedo Vladimir players
FC Sportakademklub Moscow players
Sportspeople from Voronezh Oblast